Galgun, also known as Deh Gerdu, may refer to:
 Galguni
 Galkun